The Life Centre is a special school located in Digeo Martin in Trinidad and Tobago. It caters to pupils with low function autism. The director is Suzy Deverteuil.

References

External links
 
 
 

Schools in Trinidad and Tobago
Schools for people on the autistic spectrum